The Council of Hungarian Internet Providers (ISZT), founded in 1995, is the exclusive holder of the registration and management of public domains under the .hu ccTLD.

Since its establishment, ISZT's most important activities have been the operation and administration of the .hu ccTLD and the operation of BIX (Budapest Internet Exchange).

References